Guillaume de Tournemire (18 July 1901 – 16 August 1970) was a French modern pentathlete. He competed at the 1924 Summer Olympics.

References

External links
 

1901 births
1970 deaths
French male modern pentathletes
Olympic modern pentathletes of France
Modern pentathletes at the 1924 Summer Olympics
Sportspeople from Tours, France